Barybela is a genus of moths of the family Noctuidae.

Species
 Barybela chionostigma Turner, 1944

References
 Barybela at Markku Savela's Lepidoptera and Some Other Life Forms
 Natural History Museum Lepidoptera genus database

Hadeninae